Phenolic paper is a material often used to make printed circuit board substrates (the flat board to which the components and traces are attached).  It is a very tough board made of wood fibre and phenolic polymers.  It is most commonly brown in colour, and is a fibre reinforced plastic. These PCB materials are known as FR-1 and FR-2 – FR-2 is rated to 130°C, FR-1 is rated to 105°C.

References

Electronics manufacturing
Synthetic paper